The 1990–91 NBA season was the Charlotte Hornets' third season in the National Basketball Association. In the 1990 NBA draft, the Hornets had the fifth overall pick, and selected Kendall Gill from the University of Illinois. After playing one year in the Midwest Division in the Western Conference, the Hornets returned to the Eastern Conference and moved into the Central Division. In the off-season, the team signed free agent Johnny Newman, and later on traded Armen Gilliam to the Philadelphia 76ers in exchange for Mike Gminski at midseason. The franchise improved seven games over the previous season finishing with 26 wins and 56 losses. However, they finished last place in their division for the third straight season.

Newman led the team in scoring with 16.9 points per game, while Rex Chapman averaged 15.7 points per game, and second-year forward J.R. Reid provided the team with 11.1 points and 6.3 rebounds per game. In addition, Gill averaged 11.0 points and 1.3 steals per game, and was named to the NBA All-Rookie First Team, while Dell Curry contributed 10.6 points per game off the bench, and Muggsy Bogues provided with 7.0 points, 8.3 assists and 1.7 steals per game. 

The Hornets led the NBA in home-game attendance for the second time in three seasons. Charlotte also hosted the 1991 NBA All-Star Game during the season. Following the season, Kelly Tripucka retired.

Offseason

NBA Draft

Roster

Regular season

Season standings

z – clinched division title
y – clinched division title
x – clinched playoff spot

Record vs. opponents

Game log

Player statistics

Awards and records
 Kendall Gill, NBA All-Rookie Team 1st Team

Transactions
 July 28, 1990

Signed Johnny Newman as an unrestricted free agent.
 August 29, 1990

Signed Jim Les as a free agent.
 September 5, 1990

Waived Brian Rowsom.
 October 23, 1990

Waived Jim Les.
 October 24, 1990

Waived Andre Turner.
 October 30, 1990

Waived Richard Anderson.

Waived Mike Holton.
 January 4, 1991

Traded Armen Gilliam and Dave Hoppen to the Philadelphia 76ers for Mike Gminski.
 January 22, 1991

Signed Scott Haffner to the first of two 10-day contracts.

Signed Jeff Sanders to a 10-day contract.
 January 29, 1991

Traded a 1993 2nd round draft pick (Alex Holcombe was later selected) and a 1995 2nd round draft pick (Dejan Bodiroga was later selected) to the Sacramento Kings for Eric Leckner.
 January 31, 1991

Waived Jeff Sanders.
 February 11, 1991

Signed Scott Haffner to a contract for the rest of the season.
 April 17, 1991

Robert Reid signed as an unrestricted free agent with the Philadelphia 76ers.
 May 31, 1991

Waived Steve Scheffler.

Player Transactions Citation:

References

Charlotte Hornets seasons
Char
Tar
Tar